Independence Township is a township in Warren County, in the U.S. state of New Jersey. As of the 2020 United States census, the township's population was 5,469, a decrease of 193 (−3.4%) from the 2010 census count of 5,662, which in turn reflected an increase of 59 (+1.1%) from the 5,603 counted in the 2000 census.

History 
Independence Township was originally created on November 11, 1782, from Hardwick Township, while the area was still part of Sussex County, and was incorporated as one of the state's initial group of 104 townships by an act of the New Jersey Legislature on February 21, 1798. Most of Independence Township became part of the newly created Warren County on November 20, 1824, with the remainder becoming part of Green Township in Sussex County. Portions of the township were taken to form Hackettstown (March 9, 1853) and Allamuchy Township (April 4, 1873). The township was named for American independence.

Through the Township the major brooks and the Great Meadows drain into the Pequest River which winds slowly from northeast to southwest to flow on through the county and eventually into the Delaware River at Belvidere. Part of the eastern land drains under the Morris Canal bed and south into the Musconetcong River just below the boundary with Mansfield Township. The hillsides are steep, layered with rock and limestone while the valleys still hold soil deposited here from the receding glaciers. Mastodon bones and a few relics of the early Indian dwellers still occasionally can be found as well as coveys of game birds, some white tail deer and small game.

This area was initially settled and cleared as farmland for growing hay and grain or as pastureland. Timber was cut for lumber, grain was milled into flour, and some iron ore was mined from the Jenny Jump Mountain area during the late eighteenth and early nineteenth century. The mining of iron ore which attracted the early settlers, the later iron foundries, and many of the early industries have disappeared as has the Morris Canal and the railroads as the major means of shipping freight. After many attempts the Great Meadow was drained with the water channeled to permit successful development of commercial vegetable production. Shipping over the years has been by wagon, small trucks, rail freight, and then by large trailer trucks.

Geography
According to the United States Census Bureau, the township had a total area of 19.98 square miles (51.75 km2), including 19.83 square miles (51.36 km2) of land and 0.15 square miles (0.39 km2) of water (0.76%).

Great Meadows (2010 Census population of 303) and Vienna (population of 981 as of 2010) are unincorporated communities and census-designated places (CDPs) located within the township. Through the 2000 United States Census, the areas were grouped together as Great Meadows-Vienna, which had a population of 1,264 as of that year.

Other unincorporated communities, localities and place names located partially or completely within the township include Petersburgh.

The township borders the Warren County municipalities of Allamuchy Township, Frelinghuysen Township, Hackettstown, Liberty Township and Mansfield Township.

Demographics

The Township's economic data (as is all of Warren County) is calculated by the US Census Bureau as part of the Allentown-Bethlehem-Easton, PA-NJ Metropolitan Statistical Area.

2010 census

The Census Bureau's 2006–2010 American Community Survey showed that (in 2010 inflation-adjusted dollars) median household income was $89,844 (with a margin of error of +/− $7,094) and the median family income was $104,808 (+/− $8,796). Males had a median income of $72,719 (+/− $6,017) versus $58,413 (+/− $7,006) for females. The per capita income for the borough was $36,372 (+/− $2,731). About 1.6% of families and 1.8% of the population were below the poverty line, including 2.2% of those under age 18 and 7.7% of those age 65 or over.

2000 census
As of the 2000 United States census there were 5,603 people, 2,146 households, and 1,489 families residing in the township. The population density was 282.4 people per square mile (109.0/km2). There were 2,210 housing units at an average density of 111.4 per square mile (43.0/km2). The racial makeup of the township was 94.98% White, 1.16% African American, 0.05% Native American, 1.73% Asian, 0.79% from other races, and 1.29% from two or more races. Hispanic or Latino of any race were 3.77% of the population.

There were 2,146 households, out of which 36.5% had children under the age of 18 living with them, 60.0% were married couples living together, 6.8% had a female householder with no husband present, and 30.6% were non-families. 24.5% of all households were made up of individuals, and 7.0% had someone living alone who was 65 years of age or older. The average household size was 2.61 and the average family size was 3.18.

In the township the population was spread out, with 26.8% under the age of 18, 5.2% from 18 to 24, 34.9% from 25 to 44, 25.1% from 45 to 64, and 8.0% who were 65 years of age or older. The median age was 37 years. For every 100 females, there were 93.7 males. For every 100 females age 18 and over, there were 90.4 males.

The median income for a household in the township was $67,247, and the median income for a family was $79,819. Males had a median income of $59,688 versus $37,643 for females. The per capita income for the township was $30,555. About 1.2% of families and 2.8% of the population were below the poverty line, including 2.0% of those under age 18 and 6.3% of those age 65 or over.

Government

Local government 
Independence Township is governed under the Township form of New Jersey municipal government, one of 141 municipalities (of the 564) statewide that use this form, the second-most commonly used form of government in the state. The Township Committee is comprised of five members, who are elected directly by the voters at-large in partisan elections to serve three-year terms of office on a staggered basis, with either one or two seats coming up for election each year as part of the November general election in a three-year cycle. At an annual reorganization meeting, the Township Committee selects one of its members to serve as Mayor.

, members of the Independence Township Committee are Mayor Robert M. Giordano (R, term on committee ends December 31, 2024; term as mayor ends 2022), Glenn Cougle (R, 2024), Kathleen Gesumaria (R, 2023), Bonnie Kelsey (R, 2023) and Michael S. Pennington (R, 2022).

Federal, state, and county representation 
Independence Township is located in the 7th Congressional District and is part of New Jersey's 24th state legislative district. 

Prior to the 2011 reapportionment following the 2010 Census, Independence Township had been in the 23rd state legislative district.

Politics
As of March 2011, there were a total of 3,789 registered voters in Independence Township, of which 691 (18.2% vs. 21.5% countywide) were registered as Democrats, 1,384 (36.5% vs. 35.3%) were registered as Republicans and 1,709 (45.1% vs. 43.1%) were registered as Unaffiliated. There were 5 voters registered as Libertarians or Greens. Among the township's 2010 Census population, 66.9% (vs. 62.3% in Warren County) were registered to vote, including 87.3% of those ages 18 and over (vs. 81.5% countywide).

In the 2012 presidential election, Republican Mitt Romney received 1,500 votes (58.8% vs. 56.0% countywide), ahead of Democrat Barack Obama with 964 votes (37.8% vs. 40.8%) and other candidates with 51 votes (2.0% vs. 1.7%), among the 2,550 ballots cast by the township's 3,836 registered voters, for a turnout of 66.5% (vs. 66.7% in Warren County). In the 2008 presidential election, Republican John McCain received 1,559 votes (55.7% vs. 55.2% countywide), ahead of Democrat Barack Obama with 1,159 votes (41.4% vs. 41.4%) and other candidates with 49 votes (1.8% vs. 1.6%), among the 2,797 ballots cast by the township's 3,784 registered voters, for a turnout of 73.9% (vs. 73.4% in Warren County). In the 2004 presidential election, Republican George W. Bush received 1,763 votes (64.4% vs. 61.0% countywide), ahead of Democrat John Kerry with 927 votes (33.9% vs. 37.2%) and other candidates with 35 votes (1.3% vs. 1.3%), among the 2,736 ballots cast by the township's 3,518 registered voters, for a turnout of 77.8% (vs. 76.3% in the whole county).

In the 2013 gubernatorial election, Republican Chris Christie received 72.5% of the vote (1,037 cast), ahead of Democrat Barbara Buono with 26.3% (376 votes), and other candidates with 1.2% (17 votes), among the 1,450 ballots cast by the township's 3,879 registered voters (20 ballots were spoiled), for a turnout of 37.4%. In the 2009 gubernatorial election, Republican Chris Christie received 1,176 votes (63.8% vs. 61.3% countywide), ahead of Democrat Jon Corzine with 435 votes (23.6% vs. 25.7%), Independent Chris Daggett with 182 votes (9.9% vs. 9.8%) and other candidates with 24 votes (1.3% vs. 1.5%), among the 1,842 ballots cast by the township's 3,733 registered voters, yielding a 49.3% turnout (vs. 49.6% in the county).

Education 
Public school students in pre-kindergarten through eighth grade attend the Great Meadows Regional School District, together with students from Liberty Township. The New Jersey Superior Court, Appellate Division blocked a 2007 effort by Liberty Township to leave the Great Meadows district based on Liberty's greater share of district costs, with the court citing the inability of the two communities to provide an efficient education separately. As of the 2018–19 school year, the district, comprised of three schools, had an enrollment of 662 students and 73.0 classroom teachers (on an FTE basis), for a student–teacher ratio of 9.1:1. Schools in the district (with 2018–19 school year enrollment from the National Center for Education Statistics) are
Central Elementary School with 221 students in grades Pre-K–2, 
Liberty Elementary School with 204 students in grades 3–5 and 
Great Meadows Middle School with 239 students in grades 6–8.

Students attending public school for ninth through twelfth grades attend Hackettstown High School which serves students from Hackettstown, along with students from the townships of Allamuchy and Liberty, as part of a sending/receiving relationship with the Hackettstown School District. As of the 2018–19 school year, the high school had an enrollment of 828 students and 68.6 classroom teachers (on an FTE basis), for a student–teacher ratio of 12.1:1.

Students from the township and from all of Warren County are eligible to attend Ridge and Valley Charter School in Frelinghuysen Township (for grades K–8) or Warren County Technical School in Washington borough (for 9–12), with special education services provided by local districts supplemented throughout the county by the Warren County Special Services School District in Oxford Township (for Pre-K–12).

Transportation

Interstate 80 misses the township by less than 100 feet, but is accessible in both neighboring Allamuchy Township (exit 19) and Hope Township (exit 12).

The Great Meadows Railroad Station, along the abandoned Lehigh and Hudson Railway, is the only nineteenth-century station to  remain preserved with all its structures. It was placed on the New Jersey and National Register of Historic Places in 1989.

Notable people

People who were born in, residents of, or otherwise closely associated with Independence Township include:
 Bobby Caldwell (1951–2023), singer, songwriter, and musician, best known for his signature song "What You Won't Do for Love"
 Christina Desiderio (born 2000), artistic gymnast
 Chuck Haytaian (born 1938), former speaker of the New Jersey General Assembly
 Edwin Kaprat (1964–1995), serial killer, rapist, and arsonist who committed six murders in Tampa and Hernando County, Florida from 1991 to 1993, mst being elderly women.
 Cole Kimball (born 1985), former professional baseball pitcher who played for the Washington Nationals

References

External links

Independence Township website

 
1782 establishments in New Jersey
Populated places established in 1782
Township form of New Jersey government
Townships in Warren County, New Jersey